Socorro, officially the Municipality of Socorro,  is a 3rd class municipality in the province of Oriental Mindoro, Philippines. According to the 2020 census, it has a population of 41,585 people.

History
Socorro was established as a separate municipality on June 22, 1963, with the approval of Republic Act. No. 3609. It was formerly part of Pola.

In the last decade of the 20th century and the first decade of the 21st century, many roads were paved, the market rebuilt, and employment rose.

Geography

Barangays
Socorro is politically subdivided into 26 barangays.

Climate

Demographics

Economy 

Agriculture still provides the main industry with rice, fruits, and coconut products dominating.  Citrus products like calamansi, dalandan and pomelo are also abundant here together with rambutan and lanzones. Fresh fish from Lake Naujan at the northern end of the municipality and Balut are also important products. There is a large Mangyan population in the more remote parts of the municipality, and programs of assistance for these people have been implemented.

Government
 Mayor: Nemmen O. Perez
 Vice Mayor: Roy A. De Claro

Education
Leuteboro National High School 
Socorro Central School
Mina de Oro Catholic High School (MDOCHS)
Grace Mission College
IATEC Computer College
Bayuin National High School
Fortuna National High School
ACTS
Fortuna Elementary School
Catiningan Elementary School
Batong Dalig Elementary School

References

External links
Socorro Profile at PhilAtlas.com
[ Philippine Standard Geographic Code]
Philippine Census Information
Local Governance Performance Management System

Municipalities of Oriental Mindoro